Knowsley Metropolitan Borough Council is the local authority of the Metropolitan Borough of Knowsley in Merseyside, England. It is a metropolitan district council, one of five in Merseyside and one of 36 in the metropolitan counties of England, and provides the majority of local government services in Knowsley. It is a constituent council of the Liverpool City Region Combined Authority.

History
The current local authority was first elected in 1973, a year before formally coming into its powers and prior to the creation of the Metropolitan Borough of Knowsley on 1 April 1974. The council gained borough status, entitling it to be known as Knowsley Metropolitan Borough Council.

Political control

Since the first election to the council in 1973 political control of the council has been held by the following parties:

Premises
The council's main offices and meeting place are at the Municipal Buildings in Archway Road in Huyton. The building was erected in 1962–1963, formally opening in November 1963 as the headquarters of Huyton-with-Roby Urban District Council, one of Knowsley's predecessor authorities.

References

Metropolitan district councils of England
Local authorities in Merseyside
Leader and cabinet executives
Local education authorities in England
Billing authorities in England
1974 establishments in England
Borough Council